Night Over Chile is a 1977 Soviet drama film directed by Sebastián Alarcón and Aleksandr Kosarev. It was entered into the 10th Moscow International Film Festival where it won the Special Prize.

Plot
Young architect Manuel's (Grigore Grigoriu) life purpose is to construct new beautiful houses. He is not interested in politics, showing everyone around him complete neutrality. However the events of 11 September 1973 shatter his perfect little world. The murder of lawful President Allende, arrests without charges and court decisions fundamentally change Manuel's outlook on what is happening. Because a leftist activist escaped from a raid through his apartment, the architect gets thrown into jail, goes through torture and abuse, and witnesses mass executions (at the infamous National Stadium). Manuel understands that the only way for an honest man is the path of the political struggle, the national resistance.

Cast
 Grigore Grigoriu as Salvador
 Nartai Begalin as Chilean soldier
 Olegar Fedoro as Crime Reporter (as Oleg Fedorov)
 Baadur Tsuladze as Senator
 Sebastián Alarcón as Sergeant

References

External links
 

1977 films
1977 drama films
Soviet drama films
Russian drama films
1970s Russian-language films
Films about the Chilean military dictatorship
Films set in Chile
Films about coups d'état